Paint Creek is a stream mostly located within Washtenaw County in the U.S. state of Michigan.  The stream flows south before entering as a tributary to Stony Creek along the county line with Monroe County.

Paint Creek is also the name of an unincorporated community that dates back to 1829.  It is located along the creek within Augusta Township.

Community of Paint Creek
A community named Paint Creek was settled by James Miller along the banks of the creek in southwest Washtenaw County as early as 1829.  It was originally known by its native Chippewa name of Wejinigan-sibi, translated as Paint Creek, which the settlement was later known by its English settlers.  A post office named Paint Creek was established on January 15, 1833, with David Hardy as the first postmaster.  The station was an important route linking the city of Monroe to the southeast and the village of Ypsilanti to the northwest.

Augusta Township, where the community is located, was established in 1836, and Paint Creek served as its first post office.  The post office was later renamed Newcomb on September 27, 1881, and finally to Willis on December 15, 1887.  The Willis post office remains in operation and utilizes the 48191 ZIP Code, which covers most of eastern Augusta Charter Township.

The creek flows north–south just west of this intersection. Paint Creek continues to exist as a small unincorporated community with no legal autonomy.

Description
From its source, it flows briefly northeast through the city of Ypsilanti near the Huron River and Ford Lake. The river then meanders south into Ypsilanti Township and rural Augusta Township.

The creek ends when it joins Stony Creek at the county line in London Township in Monroe County.  Paint Creek is one of the main tributaries of Stony Creek, along with Sugar and Buck creeks, as well as numerous drainage canals.  Stony Creek itself flows for a much longer distance all the way to Lake Erie within Frenchtown Township in Monroe County.  Paint Creek is a designated cold-water stream, as it also receives sources from groundwater and has a colder than average temperature.

Paint Creek contains no dams along its route, and it is also fed by numerous irrigation canals and lesser streams, including the McCarthy Drain.  The creek's largest tributary is West Branch Paint Creek.  It is a  creek that begins near Ypsilanti.  Because of high agricultural usage of the area, the tributary is prone to increased flooding and erosion.  The upper portion of Paint Creek is also threatened due to increasing development within Pittsfield Township and Ypsilanti.

The creek contains numerous bridges and crossing, including an underpass along Interstate 94 and U.S. Route 12.  Many of the bridges are very small, and some of the more rural bridges along the southern route of the creek are listed as "severe" and in need of repairs or replacement by the Michigan Department of Transportation.  Bridges listed include crossings at Rosbolt Road and Liss Road in Augusta Township.

Paint Creek is also the name of two other streams in the state of Michigan.  One is located in Iron County in the state's Upper Peninsula.  Another Paint Creek is located nearby in Oakland County just northeast of Washtenaw County.  This creek is also located near another Stony Creek (Stony Creek Metropark), which is part of the Clinton River system.

Fishing
Paint Creek was once a designated trout stream with an active fish population that was stocked with brown trout.  Limited access and low angler usage led to the end of the stocking efforts in the early 1990s.

Fish sampling and testing along the creek continues with the possibility of redeveloping the creek into a viable fishing location.  In 2010, a survey recorded over 20 different fish species observed in Paint Creek.  The most abundant species were creek chub and green sunfish, while other species included white sucker, central mudminnow, bluegill, bluntnose minnow, gizzard shad, greenside darter, round goby, and mottled sculpin.  Rarer fish observed included common carp, johnny darter, hornyhead chub, orangespotted sunfish, hybrid sunfish, grass pickerel, blackside darter, largemouth bass, tadpole madtom, common shiner, and striped shiner.  Only two trout were observed in the 2010 study, although trout are not known to be a well-producing natural species within the creek.

Recent development is aiming to increase the creek's usage by providing more access to parks and trails along its route. A proposed restoration project would increase the creek's volume and accessibility, especially in the more developed areas in the upper portion of the creek in Pittsfield Township and Ypsilanti.  At one time, Paint Creek was the only designated trout stream in the region but has recently been listed as an impaired river by the Michigan Department of Environmental Quality.  Restoration of the creek can ultimately allow for an increased fish population and potential restocking efforts in the future.

References 

Rivers of Washtenaw County, Michigan
Rivers of Monroe County, Michigan
Rivers of Michigan